ANM may refer to:

 Administrația Națională de Meteorologie, the Romanian public weather prediction organisation
 Alaska Naval Militia, the naval force of Alaska
 Anisotropic Network Model, a tool for Normal Mode analysis of proteins
 ANM (Naples) (formally Azienda Napoletana Mobilità), a large public transit agency in Naples, Italy
 Antsirabato Airport, Antalaha, Madagascar, from its IATA airport code
 Arab Nationalist Movement, a former pan-Arab nationalist organization
 Australian Nationalist Movement, a neo-Nazi organisation founded by Jack van Tongeren
 Australian Newsprint Mills, Australian company
 Auxiliary nurse midwife, village level female health worker in India